Laridae is a family of seabirds in the order Charadriiformes that includes the gulls, terns, skimmers and kittiwakes. It includes around 100 species arranged into 22 genera. They are an adaptable group of mostly aerial birds found worldwide.

Taxonomy

The family Laridae was introduced (as Laridia) by the French polymath Constantine Samuel Rafinesque in 1815. Historically, Laridae were restricted to the gulls, while the terns were placed in a separate family, Sternidae, and the skimmers in a third family, Rynchopidae. The noddies were traditionally included in Sternidae. In 1990 Charles Sibley and Jon Ahlquist included auks and skuas in a broader family Laridae.

A molecular phylogenetic study by Baker and colleagues published in 2007 found that the noddies in the genus Anous formed a sister group to a clade containing the gulls, skimmers and the other terns. To create a monophyletic family group, Laridae was expanded to include the genera that had previously been in Sternidae and Rynchopidae.

Baker and colleagues found that the Laridae lineage diverged from a lineage that gave rise to both the skuas (Stercorariidae) and auks (Alcidae) before the end of the Cretaceous in the age of dinosaurs. They also found that the Laridae themselves began expanding in the early Paleocene, around 60 million years ago. The German palaeontologist Gerald Mayr has questioned the validity of these early dates and suggested that inappropriate fossils were used in calibrating the molecular data. The earliest charadriiform fossils date only from the late Eocene, around 35 million years ago.

Anders Ödeen and colleagues investigated the development of ultraviolet vision in shorebirds, by looking for the SWS1 opsin gene in various species; as gulls were the only shorebirds known to have developed the trait. They discovered that the gene was present in the gull, skimmer and noddy lineages but not the tern lineage. They also recovered the noddies as an early lineage, though the evidence was not strong.

For the complete list of species, see the article List of Laridae species.

Noddies
Genus Anous (5 species)
Genus Gygis (white tern)

Skimmers
Genus Rynchops (3 species)

Gulls
Genus Creagrus (swallow-tailed gull)
Genus Rissa (kittiwakes) (2 species)
Genus Pagophila (ivory gull)
Genus Xema (Sabine's gull)
Genus Chroicocephalus (11 species)
Genus Hydrocoloeus (little gull)
Genus Rhodostethia (Ross's gull)
Genus Leucophaeus (5 species)
Genus Ichthyaetus (6 species)
Genus Larus (24 species)

Terns
Genus Gelochelidon (2 species)
Genus Hydroprogne (Caspian tern)
Genus Thalasseus (8 species)
Genus Sternula (7 species)
Genus Onychoprion (4 species)
Genus Sterna (13 species)
Genus Chlidonias (4 species)
Genus Phaetusa (large-billed tern)
Genus Larosterna (Inca tern)

Distribution and habitat

The Laridae have spread around the world, and their adaptability has likely been a factor. Most have become much more aerial than their ancestor, which was likely some form of shorebird.

Notes

References

Further reading
 Grant, Peter J. (1986) Gulls: a guide to identification 
 Howell, Steve N. G. and Jon Dunn (2007) Gulls of the Americas 
 Olsen, Klaus Malling & Larsson, Hans (1995): Terns of Europe and North America. Christopher Helm, London.

External links

 
Seabirds
Bird families
Taxa named by Constantine Samuel Rafinesque